Hernán de la Fuente (born 7 January 1997) is an Argentine professional footballer who plays as a defender for Atlético Tucumán on loan from the Portuguese club Famalicão.

Career
De la Fuente started off with Vélez Sarsfield. The first professional appearance of his career arrived midway through the 2017–18 Argentine Primera División campaign, when he played the full duration of a 1–0 loss to Huracán on 20 November 2017. In total, De la Fuente made seventeen appearances in his debut league season. He signed a new contract through to 2021 on 22 May 2018.

On 13 August 2021, he signed a three-year contract with Famalicão in Portugal.

Career statistics
.

Honours
Argentina U23
Pre-Olympic Tournament: 2020

References

1997 births
Footballers from Buenos Aires
Living people
Argentine footballers
Association football defenders
Club Atlético Vélez Sarsfield footballers
F.C. Famalicão players
Atlético Tucumán footballers
Argentine Primera División players
Primeira Liga players
Olympic footballers of Argentina
Footballers at the 2020 Summer Olympics
Argentine expatriate footballers
Expatriate footballers in Portugal
Argentine expatriate sportspeople in Portugal